Xenophrys major is a species of toad found in northeastern India, Burma, Thailand, Cambodia, Laos, Vietnam, and southern China. It has recently been reported also from Bhutan.

References

Xenophrys
Amphibians of Bhutan
Amphibians of Myanmar
Amphibians of Cambodia
Amphibians of China
Frogs of India
Amphibians of Laos
Amphibians of Thailand
Amphibians of Vietnam
Taxa named by George Albert Boulenger
Amphibians described in 1908